Alherd or Alhard or Elehred or Alharod, in Iran, may refer to:
 Alherd, Khoda Afarin
 Alharod, Varzaqan